This is a list of the top 40 Nippon Professional Baseball home run hitters. In the sport of baseball, a home run is a hit in which the batter scores by circling all the bases and reaching home plate in one play, without the benefit of a fielding error. This can be accomplished either by hitting the ball out of play while it is still in fair territory (a conventional home run), or by an inside-the-park home run. Sadaharu Oh holds the Nippon Professional Baseball home run record (as well as the world lifetime home run record) with 868. He passed Hank Aaron (who is currently second on the Major League Baseball career home run list) with 755, on September 3, 1977. The only other NPB player to have hit even 600 or more home runs is Katsuya Nomura with 657. Slugger Noboru Aota retired in 1959 as the Japanese professional baseball career leader with 265 career homers. He was surpassed in 1963 by Kazuhiro Yamauchi, the first Japanese professional baseball player to hit 300 home runs. (Yamauchi finished his career with 396 home runs.) Sadaharu Oh assumed the top spot in 1968, later becoming the first NPB hitter to surpass 600 home runs during the 1974 season. Listed are all Nippon Professional Baseball players with 300 or more home runs hit during official regular season (i.e., excluding playoffs or exhibition games). Players in bold face are active as of the 2021 Nippon Professional Baseball season (including free agents).

List

Stats updated as of 2021 season.

Notes

References

See also 
 List of Major League Baseball career home run leaders
 List of Nippon Professional Baseball players with 1,000 runs batted in
 List of Nippon Professional Baseball career hits leaders
 List of Nippon Professional Baseball earned run average champions
 Nippon Professional Baseball Most Valuable Player Award

External links 
 "Sadaharu Oh's 868 HRs Leads Japan League & World," The 500 Home Run Club

Nippon Professional Baseball